Synapsis ilicifolia is a species of plant in the Schlegeliaceae family. It is endemic to the island of Cuba. It is the sole species in the genus Synapsis, which was described as a genus in 1866.

References

Schlegeliaceae
Endemic flora of Cuba
Endangered flora of North America
Taxonomy articles created by Polbot